Betaxolol is a selective beta1 receptor blocker used in the treatment of hypertension and angina. Being selective for beta1 receptors, it typically has fewer systemic side effects than non-selective beta-blockers, for example, not causing bronchospasm (mediated by beta2 receptors) as timolol may.  Betaxolol also shows greater affinity for beta1 receptors than metoprolol. In addition to its effect on the heart, betaxolol reduces the pressure within the eye (intraocular pressure). This effect is thought to be caused by reducing the production of the liquid (which is called the aqueous humor) within the eye. The precise mechanism of this effect is not known. The reduction in intraocular pressure reduces the risk of damage to the optic nerve and loss of vision in patients with elevated intraocular pressure due to glaucoma.

It was patented in 1975 and approved for medical use in 1983.

Medical uses

Hypertension 
Betaxolol is most commonly ingested orally alone or with other medications for the management of essential hypertension. It is a cardioselective beta blocker, targeting beta-1 adrenergic receptors found in the cardiac muscle. Blood pressure is decreased by the mechanism of blood vessels relaxing and improving the flow of blood.

Glaucoma 
Ophthalmic betaxolol is an available treatment for primary open angle glaucoma (POAG) and optical hypertension. Betaxolol effectively prevents the increase of intracellular calcium, which leads to increased production of the aqueous humor. In the context of open angle glaucoma, increased aqueous humor produced by ciliary bodies increases intraocular pressure, causing degeneration of retinal ganglion cells and the optic nerve.

Furthermore, betaxolol is additionally able to protect retinal neurones following topical application from excitotoxicity or ischemia-reperfusion, providing a neuroprotective effect. This is thought to be attributed to its capacity to attenuate neuronal calcium and sodium influx.

Contraindications
 Hypersensitivity to the drug
 Patients with sinus bradycardia, heart block greater than first degree, cardiogenic shock, and overt cardiac failure

Side effects 

The adverse side-effects of betaxolol can be categorized into local and systemic effects.  The local effects include: 

 transient irritation (20-40% of patients)
 burning 
 pruritus, or general itching 
 punctate keratitis
 blurry vision

Systemically, patients taking betaxolol might experience: 

 bradycardia
 hypotension 
 fatigue
 sexual impotence
 hair loss
 confusion
 headache
 dizziness
 bronchospasm at higher doses 
 cardiac problems such as arrhythmia, bundle branch block, myocardial infarction, sinus arrest, and congestive heart failure
 mental effects such as depression, disorientation, vertigo, sleepwalking, rhinitis
 dysuria
 metabolic side effects such as an increase in LDL cholesterol levels
 can mask the symptoms of hypoglycemia diabetic patients

History
Betaxolol was approved by the U.S. Food and Drug Administration (FDA) for ocular use as a 0.5% solution (Betoptic) in 1985 and as a 0.25% solution (Betoptic S) in 1989.

Society and culture

Brand names
Brand names include Betoptic, Betoptic S, Lokren, Kerlone.

See also
 Levobetaxolol
 Cicloprolol

References

External links
 Kerlone prescribing information

Beta blockers
Cyclopropanes
Ethers
N-isopropyl-phenoxypropanolamines
Ophthalmology drugs